Oistin mac Amlaíb was a ninth-century Norse or Norse-Gael leader who is sometimes identified as a King of Dublin. He was a son of Amlaíb Conung and nephew of Ímar, founder of the Uí Ímair dynasty. He is sometimes identified with Thorstein the Red, a figure who features in the Norse sagas.

Biography
The earliest mention of Oistin may be by Cogad Gáedel re Gallaib, which in 873 describes how Bárid mac Ímair and an unnamed son of Amlaíb Conung plundered the caves of Ciarraige. This unnamed son of Amlaíb is probably Oistin. Downham suggests this raid was undertaken as a show of strength; it occurred shortly after the death of Ímar, with Bárid probably succeeding him as King of Dublin. Though Oistin is not named as a king in the annals, it has been suggested by others that Oistin and Bárid ruled together as co-kings after the death of Ímar.

The one and only mention of Oistin by name in contemporary annals is by the Annals of Ulster in 875:

"Albann" is generally agreed to be identical to Halfdan Ragnarsson, supposed son of the legendary Viking Ragnar Lodbrok. Some scholars identify Halfdan as a brother of Amlaíb, Ímar and Auisle, and hence uncle of Oistin. This identification is contingent upon Ímar being identical to Ivar the Boneless: Halfdan and Ivar are named as brothers in the Anglo-Saxon Chronicle. If Halfdan and Oistin were indeed kin, then it may explain the reason for the conflict: it was a dynastic squabble for control of the kingdom.

Identification with Thorstein the Red
Some have suggested Oistin is the same person as Thorstein the Red, a figure who features in the Norse sagas. However, this is problematic since Thorstein is said to have died in Scotland after conquering much of the country, whereas Oistin is said to have been killed in Ireland in 875 by Albann (i.e. Halfdan). Similarly, Oistin's father Amlaíb is sometimes identified with Olaf the White, a Viking sea-king who also features in the sagas and is named as the father of Thorstein the Red. The sagas are of dubious historical value, but the figures featured within may be based on real people. To get around the problem whereby Oistin and Thorstein die in different places in different circumstances, but keeping the identification of Amlaíb with Olaf the White, it has been proposed that Oistin and Thorstein were brothers.

Family
Amlaíb Conung is identified as Oistin's father by the Annals of Ulster. A brother, Carlus, is mentioned by the Annals of the Four Masters.

A number of other familial connections are known if the identification of Oistin with Thorstein the red is correct. According to the sagas, Aud the Deep-Minded, daughter of Ketil Flatnose, the King of Isles, was the mother of Thorstein. Thorstein's wife is given as Thurid (Þuríður in Old Norse), the daughter of a Geatish man named Eyvind the Easterner. Their children include at least six daughters, Osk, Vigdis, Olof, Thorhild and Thorgerd, and at least one son, Olaf Feilan.

Notes

References

Citations

Primary sources
  Accessed via Internet Archive.
 
 
  Accessed via Internet Archive.
 Accessed via Internet Archive.

Secondary sources
 
  Subscription or UK public library membership required.
 
  Subscription or UK public library membership required.

External links
 CELT: Corpus of Electronic Texts at University College Cork. The Corpus of Electronic Texts includes the Annals of Ulster and the Four Masters, the Chronicon Scotorum and the Book of Leinster as well as Genealogies, and various Saints' Lives. Most are translated into English, or translations are in progress.

875 deaths
9th-century Irish monarchs
Monarchs of Dublin
Year of birth unknown